Stéphane Cueff (born 14 October 1969) is a French racing cyclist. He rode in the 1997 Tour de France.

References

1969 births
Living people
French male cyclists
Place of birth missing (living people)